Damien Beebe, known professionally as DJ Day is a DJ, producer and musician from Palm Springs, California. He formed the Innernational Crew with DJ Rip One in 1995, and had subsequent appearances with Innernational on Return of the DJ III & Laid in Full. He has worked with Stones Throw recording artist Aloe Blacc and Clutchy Hopkins, as well as remixes for Quantic, Alice Russell, People Under The Stairs and more.

He has shared the stage with artists from Amy Winehouse to Eminem in a career spanning the last decade and a half, as well as frequently touring the continents of Asia, Europe, North America, South America and Australia as both a solo artist and representative of Red Bull Music Academy and a regular guest of the world-famous Do Over. He has released various singles as a solo artist, most notably "Four Hills" which was nominated for "Track of the Year" by Gilles Peterson's Worldwide show on BBC Radio 1 and used by DC Shoes for their PJ Ladd ad campaign.
He currently hosts a weekly Thursday night party at The Ace Hotel Palm Springs.

Full length Releases

The Day Before 
Licensed to MPM for release in 2007.

Land Of 1000 Chances
Land Of 1000 Chances was Released on February 12, 2013 as a limited edition LP, CD and Digitally on Piecelock 70, an artist collective based in Los Angeles of which Day is a founding member and co-creative director with Thes One. It debuted on iTunes in the top 20 Chart both US and worldwide in the Electronic/Downtempo genre. Prior to its release, It had been in added to several shows: Jon Oliver's Main Ingredient Show, Gilles Peterson’s BBC Radio broadcasts, and was on KCRW’s top-50 playlist for 5 weeks. Gilles Peterson invited Day in to do an interview and exclusive mix, which was posted online on Feb. 5th, 2013.

Though it had not been officially released yet, KCRW DJ  Jeremy Sole listed Land Of 1000 Chances the #8 album of the year in 2012. Both the track and the album were promoted by magazines & blogs, including:
Impose Magazine,
URB,
RIK,
Music Is My Sanctuary,
Okayplayer,
Ego Trip Land,
HypeTrak, 
This Is Book's Music, 
Giant Step, 
Textura (album of the month), 
BBC Music Review, and
PopMatters.

On Feb. 11, 2013, Vevo and Piecelock 70 released the "Land Of 1000 Chances" video on Youtube.

Discography
Return of the DJ 3 (Bomb Hip Hop 1999) 
Laid In Full (Ill Boogie)
Emanon “Anon & On” (production, scratches and vocals on "A Day in Exile") (Ill Boogie)
Blame One “A Complex Burden” (Polish Pub Music 2004) 
Credit is Due (7T5 2004) 
People Music (7T5)
50 (7T5)
52 (7T5)
Innernational Comp 1-3 (INL)
On the Air (7T5)
Summer of Serato (Subcontact Japan 2006) 
Brazilectro 8 (Audiopharm 2006) 
Boozoo Bajou - Juke Joint 2 (K7 2006) 
The Day Before (MPM 2007) 
Land of 1000 Chances (PL70, 2013)
The Day Before (Deluxe Version) (PL70, 2013)
Náufrago (with Thes One, PL70, 2017)
Life After You (2022)

Records
“What Planet What Station” 12”(Milkcrate)
“Make You” 7”(Curio)
“Lucien” 7” (Subcontact)
"Gone Bad" 12" (MPM)
"DITS" 7" (Subcontact)
"Lovebug" Absence Of Color 5 & 6 12" (Sound in Color)
"Primera" 7" (Subcontact)
"Got to Get it Right" 12" EP (MPM)
 Daily Bread 12" (feat. Aloe Blacc & Dr. Oop) (Subcontact)
 Instant Saadiq 12" EP (feat. Miles Bonny) (MPM)
"Kossa" 7" (Anthem Records)

Remixes
Aloe Blacc - "Ordinary People Remix Suite" (DJ Day & Aloe Blacc remix)
Kutiman - "Music is Ruling My World" (MPM)
Mo' Horizons - "A Y N'ama" (Agogo)
Janko Nilovic -" Leslie's Back (Chorus For Leslie)" (Vadim)
People Under The Stairs - "Step Bacc" (Piecelock70)
People Under The Stairs - "Trippin at the Disco" (OM Records)
Incognito - "I Come Alive" (Heads Up International)
Tittsworth - "Here He Comes (ft. Nina Sky & Pitbull)" (T&A/Plant Music)
Exile - "Love" (Plug Research)
Alice Russell - All Alone (DJ Day Meets Clutchy Hopkins remix) (Little Poppet)
Quantic "Mas Pan" (Tru Thoughts)
People Under The Stairs - "Down In LA" (Piecelock70)

Videos
 Land Of 1000 Chances, shot by Director/Cinematographer Erick Lee, released Feb. 11, 2013.

Awards and press
"Mama Shelter" was featured as KCRW's "Top Tune Of The Day" on Feb. 6, 2013.
1999 Moves & Grooves DJ Battle Champion
XLR8R
Village Voice (Nominated for Pazz and Jop award 2004 for "What Planet What Station")
XXL
URB Magazine
The Fader
Your From Where? Magazine
Vinyl Exchange
Palm Springs Life
Stealth Magazine
The Desert Post Weekly
Hidden (Japan)
Coachella Valley Independent

References

External links
 https://web.archive.org/web/20151009132826/http://pl70.net/
 http://www.myspace.com/djday
 http://www.likeathrottle.blogspot.com
 https://web.archive.org/web/20070927001749/http://www.olski.net/index.php?area=artists&view=detail&id=219
 http://www.thefader.com/blog/articles/2006/08/02/day-tripper
 https://web.archive.org/web/20060210232646/http://www.5thplatoon.com/articles/urbmag.htm

American DJs
Record producers from California
American hip hop musicians
Living people
American jazz musicians
Year of birth missing (living people)